The smooth lumpfish (Aptocyclus ventricosus) is a species of marine ray-finned fish belonging to the family Cyclopteridae, the lumpfishes and lumpsuckers. This species is found in the northern Pacific Ocean. It is the only species in the monospecific genus Aptocyclus.

Taxonomy
The smooth lumpfish was first formally described as Cyclopterus ventricosus in 1769 by the German zoologist Peter Simon Pallas with its type locality given as  Tauyskaya Bay near Ol'skiy Island in the Sea of Okhotsk. In 1835 Auguste-Jean-Marie Bachelot De la Pylaie placed C. ventricosus in the monospecific genus Aptocyclus. The 5th edition of Fishes of the World does not recognize subfamilies within the Cyclopteridae, however, other authorities place the smooth lumpfish in the subfamily Liparopsinae.

Description
They look brownish gray with dark spots dorsally, muddy gray ventrally. They have naked skin without scales and tubercles. A smooth lumpfish has no dorsal spines or anal spines, eight to nine dorsal soft rays, and seven to nine anal soft rays. They have a rounded caudal fin and large and broadly based pectoral fins. Their pelvic fins are modified to form a clinging disc with a thickened margin on the ventral surface of the body. They have their first dorsal fins completed embedded under the skin.

Habitat and Diet
Smooth lumpfish are widely distributed throughout the North Pacific, especially in the Aleutian Basin. They inhabit both near-bottom and mid-water layers, ranging from 5to 1,700m. They are preyed upon by certain fish species, marine mammals and seabirds. Their preferred diet consists of medusa and ctenophores, and they occasionally also feed on pelagic polychaetes and crustaceans.

Reproduction
The smooth lumpfish is an iteroparous gonochoristic species with determinate fecundity, group-synchronous ovary organization, total spawning (release of 1 batch of eggs per breeding season), and external fertilization. A thick envelope protects these demersal eggs from mechanical damage during development in the coastal zone. The incubation time between fertilization and hatching is more than 40days. Males protect the egg clusters after females spawn.

References

Cyclopteridae
Monotypic fish genera
Fish described in 1769
Taxa named by Peter Simon Pallas
Fish of the North Pacific
Fish of the Bering Sea